Liolaemus reichei, Stolzmann's Pacific iguana or Stolzmann's lizard, is a species of lizard in the family Liolaemidae. It is native to Peru and Chile.

References

reichei
Reptiles described in 1907
Reptiles of Peru
Reptiles of Chile
Taxa named by Franz Werner